Cobras and Fire (The Mastermind Redux)  is the eleventh studio album by the American rock band Monster Magnet. The album is a reworking of material previously included on Mastermind (2010).

In regards to the album, Dave Wyndorf told Blabbermouth.net:

Track listing
 "She Digs That Hole" – 5:48
 "Watch Me Fade" – 3:06
 "Mastermind '69" – 6:28
 "Cobras and Fire (Hallucination Bomb)" – 9:16
 "Gods, Punks, and the Everlasting Twilight" – 6:57
 "The Titan" – 3:48
 "When the Planes Fall from the Sky (Sitar and Psych Version)" – 5:50
 "Ball of Confusion" – 7:23 (The Temptations cover)
 "Time Machine" – 6:18
 "I Live Behind the Paradise Machine: Evil Joe Barresi's Magnet Mash Vol. 1" – 8:54

Personnel
Dave Wyndorf – guitar, keyboards, vocals
Philip Caivano – bass, guitar
Bob Pantella – percussion, drums
Garrett Sweeny – guitar
Tim Cronin – backing vocals on "Ball of Confusion"
Jeff Levine – organ on "Watch Me Fade" and "Mastermind '69"
Robert Ryan – Tambora on "Cobras and Fire (Hallucination Bomb)"

References 

Monster Magnet albums
2015 albums
Napalm Records albums